Danny Tickle (born 8 April 1983) is an English former professional rugby league footballer who plays in the  for Workington Town in Betfred League 1, Tickle is also a noted goal-kicker.
During his career Tickle played for several clubs including Halifax, Wigan Warriors (Heritage No. 950), Hull F.C., Widnes Vikings, Castleford Tigers (Heritage No. 969), Leigh Centurions and Hull Kingston Rovers.

Background
Tickle was born in Golborne, Greater Manchester, England.

Senior career

Halifax (2000-02) 
At the start of his career he played for two-seasons at Halifax in the Super League. Tickle then went onto sign for the Wigan Warriors, despite interest from other Super League sides that included St. Helens.

Wigan Warriors (2002-06) 
He performed well enough to earn a new two-year contract in July 2004. The following season, Tickle was outstanding in an injury-hit Wigan squad. He went onto pick-up the Wigan Supporters 'Player of the Year Award.'

 Hull (2007-13) 
During his time at Hull F.C., Tickle enjoyed an incredible début season with the West Hull outfit in 2007, picking-up the Players,' Supporters' and Coaches' 'Player of the Year Awards. Whilst also finishing as the club's top points scorer in both the 2007 and 2008 Super League seasons. Tickle played for Hull F.C. in the 2008 Challenge Cup Final, in a 28–16 defeat by St. Helens. Tickle also represented the club in the 2013 Challenge Cup Final.

 Widnes Vikings (2014-15) 
Tickle was linked with a move to the Widnes Vikings for the 2013 Super League season, but the move never came to fruition. Until 12-months later however, Tickle joined the Widnes club for the 2014 season onwards. He was released from Widnes during the 2016 Super League season, due to an incident outside a nightclub.

 Castleford Tigers (2016) 
After his release from the Widnes outfit, he was signed in the same season by the Castleford Tigers on a short-term contract, before being signed by the Leigh Centurions.

 Leigh Centurions (2016-17) 
Tickle represented Leigh for two-years in the 2016 and 2017 Super League campaigns. Tickle unfortunately suffered relegation from the Super League with Leigh in the 2016 season, due to losing the Million Pound Game against the Catalans Dragons.

 Hull Kingston Rovers (2018) 
 2018 
In 2018, it was revealed that Tickle had signed a one-year contract to play for Hull Kingston Rovers in the Super League. Tickle scored a try on his Hull Kingston Rovers début against the Catalans Dragons. The game took-place on 15 February 2018, Hull Kingston Rovers won the game 23–4 at Craven Park. Following only one year as a player at Hull Kingston Rovers, Tickle took the decision to join Workington Town ahead of the start of the 2019 rugby league season.

 Workington Town (2019 - present) 
 2019 
On 11 December 2018, it was announced that Tickle had signed a one-year deal with League 1 outfit Workington Town, to play for the club on a part-time basis.

Workington Town Head Coach Leon Pryce said,  “Danny is a fantastic addition to the squad.”“He has many years' experience in the Super League and he is a top professional.”“Playing at the highest level will be of benefit to the squad in what is a tough league.”''' 

Tickle made his début for Workington Town on 17 February 2019, in a 28–32 victory over Oldham.

A week later on 24 February 2019, Tickle scored his first try for Workington Town in a 48–18 victory over the Crusaders.

Representative career

England Knights (2003)

2003
Tickle represented the England Knights in 2003, recording three appearances, scoring two tries and kicking 23 goals, posting 54 points in total.

England (2009)

2009
In 2009, he represented England making only a single appearance and recording only one try.

Honours

Career Awards and Accolades

Club (Wigan Warriors 2002-06)
 2005: 'Supporters' Player of the Year Award'

Club (Hull F.C. 2007-13)
 2007: 'Players' Player of the Year Award'
 2007: 'Supporters' Player of the Year Award'
 2007: 'Coaches' Player of the Year Award'

References

External links
Hull profile
Statistics at rugby-league.com
Statistics at wigan.rlfans.com

1983 births
Living people
Castleford Tigers players
England Knights national rugby league team players
England national rugby league team players
English rugby league players
Halifax R.L.F.C. players
Hull F.C. players
Hull Kingston Rovers players
Lancashire rugby league team players
Leigh Leopards players
People from Golborne
Rugby league locks
Rugby league players from Wigan
Rugby league props
Rugby league second-rows
Widnes Vikings players
Wigan Warriors players
Workington Town players